Duck Island is an unincorporated community located along the border of Hamilton Township and the city of Trenton in Mercer County, New Jersey, United States. The community takes its name from Duck Island, which extends southeastward from the community. The city of Trenton provides public docks for fishing in Duck Island.

The "Duck Island Murders"
Duck Island was frequented as a lovers' lane during the 1930s due to its remoteness and nearness to Trenton.  One evening in 1938, a young couple parked at a secluded spot on Duck Island were shot after money was demanded of them.  One died at the scene, while the second died the next day.  A year later, a second couple parked at Duck Island was shot dead.  A botched murder attempt on another young couple parked in a lovers' lane in Tullytown, Pennsylvania, led to the arrest of Clarence Hill in 1942.  Motivated by sexual and voyeuristic urges, the serial killer was convicted and sentenced to life in prison for what became known as the "Duck Island Murders".

Incinerator
In 1996, there were plans to build a $260 million trash incinerator on Duck Island, but the proposal was defeated by the Mercer County Board of chosen freeholders.

References

Hamilton Township, Mercer County, New Jersey
Neighborhoods in Trenton, New Jersey
Unincorporated communities in Mercer County, New Jersey
Unincorporated communities in New Jersey